RTK 4 (English: Radio Television of Kosovo 4, Albanian: Radio Televizioni i Kosovës 4) is the fourth public television channel of Kosovo. RTK 4 is part of the Radio Television of Kosovo (RTK), a public service broadcaster, along with the other public channels, RTK 1, RTK 2, and RTK 3. Its primary programming is documentaries, films, and locally-produced series.

About 
After the launch of the second public channel, RTK 4 was launched in March 2014, as an arts and documentaries channel for the Kosovar viewers. RTK 4 was launched along with the third channel, RTK 3, on behalf of the EBU officials. The European Broadcasting Union also helped and funded the launch of the 2 new channels.

References

External links 

2014 establishments in Kosovo
Television stations in Kosovo
Albanian-language television stations
Television channels and stations established in 2014